Olga Yakusheva (born 7 October 1974) is a Belarusian archer. She competed in the women's individual event at the 1996 Summer Olympics.

References

External links
 

1974 births
Living people
Belarusian female archers
Olympic archers of Belarus
Archers at the 1996 Summer Olympics
Sportspeople from Vitebsk